Dalarna University College is a public university college (högskola) located in Falun and Borlänge, in Dalarna County, Sweden.

Dalarna University College is one of Sweden’s more recent institutions of higher education, established in 1977. It is situated in Dalarna, 200 kilometres north-west of the capital Stockholm.

Background
In 2015, the university had 16,344 students, with 11,642 of them studying via distance education. The campuses are located in Falun, the administrative capital of the province, and in the neighbouring town of Borlänge.

Dalarna University is deemed qualified to award Phd degrees in Microdata Analysis following assessment by The Swedish National Agency for Higher Education.

Research in Complex Systems and Microdata Analysis at Borlänge campus is carried out in collaboration with business and industry, and increases the competitiveness for trade, IT, transport and tourism in the region. Research in this subject area accounts for some 35 million SEK at the university. The field has some 50 employed researchers and teachers at the Borlänge campus and on top of that a further 30 doctoral students who are able to complete their education at Dalarna University.

Locus student accommodation 
Student accommodation area Locus is located in Tjärna Ängar, a district in Borlänge designated by Swedish police as a vulnerable area, a socially deprived area with a higher crime rate. This makes life insecure for in particular female students who avoid walking alone at night due to persistent harassment. Therefore, the student union recommends relocating the campus to Falun.

In September 2020, the student union criticized the university board for placing international students in Tjärna Ängar, as foreign students expected to experience Swedish culture and traditions of Dalarna, but instead questioned whether they lived in Sweden at all since they never hear the Swedish language and instead think they live in a segregated neighbourhood. The union criticized that Tjärna Ängar was an area with a very high illiteracy, poverty and unemployment rates and low levels of education compared to other areas of Borlänge and that students had experience thefts, burglaries, stabbings and been harassed. As a result several students moved back to their country of origin or chose to pursue the courses online.

Organisation

There are three schools at the University:
 School of Technology and Business Studies 
 School of Education, Health and Social Studies 
 School of Humanities and Media Studies

See also 
 List of colleges and universities in Sweden

References

External links
Dalarna University - Official site

University colleges in Sweden
Educational institutions established in 1977
Buildings and structures in Dalarna County
1977 establishments in Sweden